Karga, is an uninhabited islet close to the northern coast of Crete in the Aegean Sea. It is located in Souda Bay opposite the islets of Palaiosouda, Souda, and Leon. Administratively, it is within the municipality of Vamos, in Chania regional unit.

See also
List of islands of Greece

Landforms of Chania (regional unit)
Uninhabited islands of Crete
Islands of Greece